Haviv Rettig Gur (b. April 4, 1981) is an Israeli journalist who serves as the political correspondent and senior analyst for The Times of Israel.

Early life
Haviv Rettig (later Rettig Gur) was born in Jerusalem. His parents were American-Jewish immigrants to Israel. He lived in the United States from 1989 to 1999, returning to Israel in 1999 to serve in the Israel Defense Forces as a combat medic. Upon completing military service, Gur studied history and Jewish thought at the Hebrew University of Jerusalem.

Media career
From 2010 to 2012, Rettig Gur served as the Director of Communications for the Jewish Agency. Before that, he was the Jewish world correspondent for the Israeli English-language daily The Jerusalem Post between June 2005 and July 2010.

According to the website of the Limmud Conference, where he was a speaker in December 2007, Gur covered "organised Jewish communities worldwide on issues including demographics, identity, anti-Semitism, education and communal politics... He dealt with Israel's contentious education budget and Israel-NATO relations. He was the Post'''s chief correspondent to the [annual Israeli security-related] Herzliya Conference."

Gur's reporting focused on trends in Jewish identity, especially in the United States and Israel.

Views and opinions
He opines regularly on what he sees as the growing divide between Israeli Jewish identity and American Jewish identity. Together, these two communities constitute some 80% of world Jewry, he writes, and their basic identities as Jews are increasingly being constructed in radically different ways.

He writes:

In August, 2009, the Jewish Agency's Masa project produced an advertisement that claimed that one-half of Diaspora Jews are assimilating and becoming "lost to us." This drew a firestorm of criticism from overseas, and led Gur to comment that the disagreement reflected this different way of constructing Jewish identity.

Controversy
In March, 2009, Gur was contacted by a man claiming to be "David Weiss, captain in the Norwegian military". Weiss was quoted in a news story written by Gur in which Norwegian Jews said they experienced tensions related to their Jewishness, mostly from Muslim immigrants and anti-Israel discourse in the media.

Contrary to the claims of some Norwegian journalists, Gur did not accuse Norwegian Minister of Finance Kristin Halvorsen of chanting "Death to Jews" in a demonstration. His story was correcting a previous, inaccurate report written by another journalist that seemed to suggest this.

In response to Norwegian journalists' inquiries, the Norwegian military claimed that no "Captain David Weiss" existed in its ranks, a claim that led the political editor of the major Norwegian daily Aftenposten, Harald Stanghelle, to accuse the military of a cover-up of Weiss' identity.

The next day, on April 5, 2009, the rival daily Dagbladet confirmed that "David Weiss" was the faked identity of a 45-year-old Oslo resident who had never served in the military. According to Dagbladet, he had fooled The Jerusalem Post'', the BBC and several major Norwegian papers.

See also
Journalism in Israel

References

External links
 Personal blog (Archived)
 Gur's writings at the Times of Israel

Israeli Jews
Israeli journalists
Living people
The Jerusalem Post people
American people of Israeli descent
1981 births
Writers from Jerusalem
Hebrew University of Jerusalem alumni